Petras is a surname. Notable people with the surname include:

Andjei Petras (born 1972), Russian composer
Ernestine Petras (1924–2017), American baseball player
Herb Petras, Canadian military commander
James Petras (born 1937), American sociologist
Kim Petras (born 1992), German singer
Spencer Petras (born 1999), American football player

See also
Petras (given name)
Petráš, Slovak family name